The Daura Emirate is a religious and traditional state in Northern Nigeria, the Emir of Daura still rules as a ceremonial hereditary monarch, and maintains a palace.
Muhammad Bashar became the emir in 1966, reigning for 41 years until his death in 2007, On 28 February 2007, Umar Faruk Umar became Emir of Daura succeeding Muhammad Bashar.

History

Origins

The Girgam mentions that the Daura Emirate was established in 2000 BC and it all began from Canaan with a man called Najibu who migrated with a group of people to Ancient Egypt. They settled in Ancient Egypt for a while and had very close relations with the Copts. They moved on to Tripoli and their leader who was then Abdudar sought to rule over the people but was unsuccessful, so he moved on with his people to a place called Tsohon Birni today in Northern Nigeria and it was this event that paved the way for the establishment of the Daura Emirate and city. Daura is the city that Bayajidda, a figure from Hausa mythology, arrived at after his trek across the Sahara.
Once there, he killed a snake (named Sarki) who prevented the people from drawing water from the well known as Kusugu, and the local queen Daurama Shawata, married him out of gratitude; one of their seven children was named Daura. The Kusugu well in Daura where Bayajidda is said to have slain Sarki is protected by a wooden shelter and has become a tourist attraction.

The emirate is referred to as one of the "seven true Hausa states" (Hausa Bakwai)
because it was, (along with Biram, Kano, Katsina, Zazzau, Gobir, and Rano), ruled by the descendants of Bayajidda's sons with Daurama and Magira (his first wife).
The University of California's African American Studies Department refers to Daura, as well as Katsina, as having been "ancient seats of Islamic culture and learning."

Modern history

In 1805, during the Fulani War, Daura was taken over by Fulani warrior Malam Ishaku, who set up an emirate. The Hausa set up rival states nearby, and the ruler of one, Malam Musa, was made the new emir of Daura by the British in 1904. Once part of Kaduna State, Daura became part of the new Katsina State in 1987. Faruk Umar Faruk became the 60th Emir of Daura on 28 Feb 2007 following the death of Sarkin Muhammadu Bashar dan Umaru.

Rulers

Early time emirs
 Abduldari
 Kufuru.
 Gino
 Yakumo
 Yakunya
 Walzamu
 Yanbamu
 Gizirgizir
 Innagari
 Daurama
 Gamata
 Shata
 Batatuma
 Sandamata
 Jamatu
 Hamata
 Zama
 Shawa
 Bawo

Fulani dynasty
 Malam Isiyaku
 Malam Yusufu
 Malam Muhammadu Sani
 Malam Zubairu
 Malam Muhammadu Bello
 Malam Muhammadu Altine
 Malam Muhammadu Mai Gardo
 Buntarawa Sogiji
 Magajiya Murnai

Zango's Rival Kingdom
 Sarkin Gwari Abdu 
 Sarki Lukudi ɗan Tsoho
 Sarki Nuhu ɗan Lukudi
 Sarki Mamman Sha ɗan Sarkin Gwari Abdu
 Sarki Haruna ɗan Sarki Lukudi
 Sarki Ɗan’aro ɗan Sarkin Gwari Abdu
 Sarki Tafida ɗan Sarki Nuhu
 Sarki Sulaiman ɗan Sarkin Gwari Abdu
 Sarki Yusufu ɗan Sarki Lukudi
 Sarki Tafida ɗan Sarki Nuhu (a Karo na biyu)

Haɓe dynasty
 Sarki Musa ɗan Sarki Nuhu
 Sarki Abdurrahman ɗan Sarki Musa
 Sarki Muhammadu Bashar
 Sarki Umar Faruq Umar

See also
Daura
Kwasarawa
Kusugu
Kabara
Bayajidda
Muhammadu Buhari

Bibliography
 S. J. Hogben und Anthony Kirk-Greene: The Emirates of Northern Nigeria, London 1966 ("Daura", p. 145-155).
 Dierk Lange: Ancient Kingdoms of West Africa, Dettelbach 2004 ("Daura", p. 219-233).
 Michael Smith: The Affairs of Daura: History and Change in a Hausa State - 1800-1958, Berkeley 1978.

References

Nigerian traditional states
History of Nigeria
Katsina State
Emirates